The Center of the American Experiment is a Minnesota-based think tank that advocates for conservative and free-market principles.

Overview
The Center of the American Experiment was founded in 1990 by Mitch Pearlstein, a former Reagan appointee. Annette Meeks previously served as the organization's CEO. It has received grants from the Bradley Foundation and the John M. Olin Foundation. Katherine Kersten is a Senior Fellow at the organization.

The Center has supported school vouchers and opposed affirmative action, particularly in academia. The organization has been credited with playing a major role in empowering conservatives in Minnesota.

References

External links
 
 EDIRC listing (provided by RePEc)
 Organizational Profile – National Center for Charitable Statistics (Urban Institute)

Non-profit organizations based in Minnesota
Organizations established in 1990
Political and economic think tanks in the United States
Conservative organizations in the United States